Lackey Ridge is an east–west ridge,  long, that forms the western end of Buckeye Table in the Ohio Range, Horlick Mountains, Antarctica. It was named by the Advisory Committee on Antarctic Names for Larry L. Lackey, a geologist with the Ohio State University expedition to the Horlick Mountains in 1960–61.

See also
Thumb Promontory

References

Ridges of Marie Byrd Land